The EMD FT is a  diesel-electric locomotive that was produced between March 1939 and November 1945, by General Motors' Electro-Motive Corporation (EMC), later known as GM Electro-Motive Division (EMD). The "F" stood for Fourteen Hundred (1400) horsepower (rounded from 1350) and the "T" for Twin, as it came standard in a two-unit set. The design was developed from the TA model built for the C,RI&P in 1937, and was similar in cylinder count, axle count, length, and layout. All told 555 cab-equipped ”A” units were built, along with 541 cabless booster or ”B” units, for a grand total of 1,096 units. The locomotives were all sold to customers in the United States. It was the first model in EMD's very successful F-unit series of cab unit freight diesels and was the locomotive that convinced many U.S. railroads that the diesel-electric freight locomotive was the future. Many rail historians consider the FT one of the most important locomotive models of all time.

Design and production 
The first units produced for a customer were built in December 1940 and January 1941 for the Atchison, Topeka and Santa Fe Railway and numbered the 100 set. These were the first diesel-electric locomotives ever produced with dynamic braking, a system developed at the insistence of the railroad and with its assistance. Initially the four-unit, coupler-equipped set featured two booster units between two cab units in the manner of the demonstrator set. The Brotherhoods of Locomotive Engineers and Firemen, however, insisted that the two cabs required two crews, so the railway had EMD produce extra boosters, and renumbered its earliest sets into four unit sets with one cab unit and three boosters. Negotiation with the unions soon rectified the situation, but as the road's earliest units were geared for higher speeds than subsequent units, these sets continued to be composed of one FTA cab unit and three FTB boosters. This is why the road had ten more FTB booster units than FTA cab units. The original A-B-B-A demonstrator set was sold to the Southern Railway.

The FT was equipped with the EMD 567 medium-speed two-stroke cycle Diesel engine, along with its many successors.

All units in a consist could be run from one cab; multiple unit (MU) control systems linked the units together. Some roads, like the initial customer Santa Fe, ordered all their FTs with regular couplers on both ends of each unit for added flexibility. This package included "hostler" controls for B units, enabling these units to be operated independently of A units for moving within yard limits, and a fifth porthole was provided in the carbody to enable the "hostler" some measure of visibility. Internally, EMD referred to these units as model FS.

Engine and powertrain
The FT introduced a 16-cylinder version of the 567 (later 567A) series engine developing  at 800 rpm. Designed specifically for railroad locomotives, this mechanically scavenged (Roots-blown) two stroke 45 degree V type, with an  bore by  stroke giving  displacement per cylinder, remained in production until 1966. A D8 D.C. generator provides power to four D7 traction motors, two on each truck, one on each axle, in a B-B arrangement. The Blomberg design introduced here has been EMD's standard B truck, used with few exceptions through the F59PHI of 1994. EMD has built all its own components since 1939.

Only the four demonstrator FTs used the 567 U-Deck engine. Those engines were replaced in the demonstrators by 567 V-Deck engines before sale to the Southern in May 1941. All FT locomotives built between December 1940 and February 1943 used the 567 V-Deck engine. The 567 V-Deck engine was replaced in production with the 567A engine in May 1943. All subsequent FT locomotives built from May 1943 to the end of production in November 1945 used the 567A engine.

Body recognition and appearance 

The FT is very similar to the later F-units in appearance, but there are some differences that render it distinguishable from later EMD freight cab units. The side panels of the FT were different, but it was fairly common for railroads to alter them to make an earlier unit appear later. As built, FT units had four porthole windows spaced closely together along their sides, and B units with couplers on both ends had a fifth window on one side for the hostler position, if equipped with hostler controls.

The roof is a more reliable indication; FTs had four exhaust stacks along the centerline (flanked by boxy structures if dynamic brakes were included). The radiator fans were recessed within the carbody, and arranged in two pairs, one near each end of the locomotive. Later units have the fans grouped together, and their shrouding extended atop the roof.

The overhangs of the body past the trucks differ in the FT compared to later units. The B-units of FTs ordered in semi-permanently coupled A-B sets, and those with couplers on both ends, have a large overhang on one end (the coupler-equipped end on the paired units) featured on no other EMD B-units. This is not present on the B-units in semi-permanently coupled A-B-A sets, which were called FTSB units (for Short Booster). At other locations, except the cab front, the FT units have less of an overhang than later units; the trucks appear to be right at the ends of the car bodies.

As with other early cab units - but unlike "hood" type locomotives - the F (and E) series used the body as a structural element, similar to a truss bridge. Most of EMD's newer passenger locomotives have a non-structural “cowl” type body built on an underframe derived from freight designs.

Wartime restrictions 

During World War II, locomotive production was regulated by the War Production Board. First priority for the diesel prime movers' manufacturing capability, as well as the materials used in the fabrication and assembly of the engines, electric generators and traction motors was for military use. Steam locomotives could be built with fewer precious materials, and with less conflict with military needs. It was also opportune for eastern railroads to stick with coal-fired steam power while petroleum distribution to the east coast was disrupted in early days of the US war effort. The traditional locomotive builders were prohibited from developing or building diesel road locomotives until early 1945, with the exception of a few dual-service ALCO DL-109s for the New Haven Railway. EMD, however, was purely a diesel builder, and therefore was allowed to build diesel freight locomotives, as consistent with fulfilling Navy needs for their 567 engines. The WPB assigned the FTs to the railroads it deemed most able to benefit from the new locomotives. Santa Fe received by far the largest allocation, given its heavy war traffic and the difficulty and expense of providing water for steam locomotives on its long desert stretches. Were it not for the wartime restrictions, many more FTs would have been built. Most railroads wanted diesels, but often had to settle for steam locomotives.

The wartime restrictions on other manufacturers' diesel programs helped ensure EMD's dominance of the postwar diesel market, as EMD exited the wartime restrictions with a fully mature diesel engine suited for high capacity road use. Other locomotive manufacturers, under extreme competitive pressure from EMD's high-powered and reliable 567 engine in the early postwar era, embarked upon crash development programs that yielded unsatisfactory results. EMD's advantage resulted in their selling the vast majority of units in the dieselization era and a death spiral for all who tried to compete with them in the early postwar market.

Subsequent models 
The FT was discontinued in late 1945, replaced in production by the F2, which retained the  rating of the FT, but with upgraded electrical and control equipment. Additionally, the mechanically driven cooling fans, which required constant tending by the locomotive's fireman, were replaced with electrically driven fans which were automatically controlled, a system which is still in use to this day. The F2 was produced only in 1946, and afterward was replaced by updated models in the EMD F-unit series, such as the F3, F7, and F9.

Original buyers

Surviving units 

Multiple EMD FT units survive today. 

The lead A-unit from demonstrator No. 103 is displayed at the National Museum of Transportation in St. Louis, Missouri. The original A unit was presented to the museum in a June 27, 1961 ceremony. The Virginia Museum of Transportation currently owns a B unit, which was on loan to the Museum of Transportation from 2015 to 2020. Both units are cosmetically restored and painted in the original GM demonstrator paint scheme. However, only the A unit is from the original demonstrator set. The two B units and the other A were eventually scrapped after years of service. The B unit now on display at Roanoke, originally just a regular FT B unit, was later stripped of its engine and other locomotive parts and converted to a boiler car. It later went to the museum in Virginia. In 1989, this former FT B unit, as well as the genuine demonstrator A unit from St. Louis, were repainted in the original demonstrator colors for a celebration at EMD (McCook, Illinois, often described by mailing address LaGrange) for the 50th anniversary of the FT. They toured together and then were returned to their respective museum owners.

One FT-A unit, FSBC 2203-A, is on display in Mexico. It was originally built for the Northern Pacific Railway.

Three B-units from the Southern Railway are preserved. #960604 is at the North Carolina Transportation Museum in Spencer, North Carolina, #960602 is in Conway, South Carolina, and #960603 is at the National Museum of Transportation in St. Louis, Missouri.

See also

 List of GM-EMD locomotives

References

Notes

Bibliography

External links

 EMC and EMD FTs by Wallace Abbey, Utah Rails
 Santa Fe Historical & Modeling Society: Santa Fe Freight FT's Santa Fe Railway Historical & Modeling Society
 EMD Freight Cab Units  Utah Rails

B-B locomotives
F01
Diesel-electric locomotives of the United States
Railway locomotives introduced in 1939
Locomotives with cabless variants
Standard gauge locomotives of the United States
B-B+B-B locomotives
Streamlined diesel locomotives